Paul J. Rogan (August 21, 1918 – January 29, 1980) was a member of the Wisconsin State Assembly and the Wisconsin State Senate.

Biography
Rogan was born on August 21, 1918 in Eagle, Wisconsin. He attended high school in De Pere, Wisconsin before attending St. Norbert College and what is now the University of Wisconsin–Madison. During World War II, he served in the United States Army. He lived in Ladysmith, Wisconsin and died in 1980.

Political career
Rogan was elected to the Assembly in 1948 and 1950 and to the Senate in 1952 and 1954. In addition, he was a member of the Committee on Permanent Organization of the 1960 Republican National Convention.

References

See also
The Political Graveyard

People from Eagle, Wisconsin
Republican Party Wisconsin state senators
Republican Party members of the Wisconsin State Assembly
Military personnel from Wisconsin
United States Army personnel of World War II
St. Norbert College alumni
University of Wisconsin–Madison alumni
1918 births
1980 deaths
20th-century American politicians
People from Ladysmith, Wisconsin